Lassa is a municipality in the Byblos District of Keserwan-Jbeil Governorate, Lebanon. It is 90 kilometers north of Beirut. Lassa has an average elevation of 1,130 meters above sea level and a total land area of 739 hectares. The village contains one public school, which enrolled 15 students in 2008. Its inhabitants are predominantly Shia Muslims with a Maronite minority.

History
Lassa was burnt by the Ottomans many times in reprisal for the Hamadeh lords' failure to remit tax incomes. In the late 18th century, the Hamadeh and most of their allied clans were driven out of Lassa and Mount Lebanon to the Beqaa valley.

References

Populated places in Byblos District
Shia Muslim communities in Lebanon